Persiju stands for Persatuan Sepakbola Indonesia Sijunjung (en: Indonesian Football Association of Sijunjung). Persiju Sijunjung is an  Indonesian football club based in Sijunjung, West Sumatra. They currently compete in the Liga 3.

References

External links
Liga-Indonesia.co.id
 

Football clubs in Indonesia
Football clubs in West Sumatra